Lee In may refer to:

Yi In, Prince Euneon (1754–1801), member of the royal family of the Joseon dynasty
Lee In (politician) (1896–1979), first Minister of Justice of South Korea
Lee In (volleyball) (born 1952), South Korean volleyball player
Lee In (actor) (born 1984), South Korean actor